The  .375 Nitro Express 2 inch Velopex , was a nitrocellulose (smokeless) powder cartridge introduced in 1899.

Overview
A hunting cartridge produced for single-shot and double rifles, the .375 Flanged NE is a slightly longer version of the .303 British necked out to .375 caliber. The .375 Flanged Nitro Express should not be confused with the .375 Flanged Magnum, a much longer and more powerful all-round African hunting cartridge.

The .375 Flanged NE is not considered suitable for hunting dangerous game, but is considered a good low velocity medium bore cartridge for woods and plains game with superior performance to the .45-70.

See also
List of rifle cartridges
9 mm rifle cartridges
Nitro Express

References

Footnotes

Bibliography
 Barnes, Frank C. & Amber, John T., Cartridges of the World, DBI Books, Northfield, 1972, .
 Kynoch Ammunition, Big Game Cartridges, kynochammunition.co.uk, retrieved 30 Dec 14.
 lee-enfieldrifles.com, Rebirth of an Old Classic the .375 Flanged Nitro Express!! (Archived 2015-01-03), retrieved 31 Dec 14.

Pistol and rifle cartridges
British firearm cartridges
Holland & Holland cartridges